Zheng Jane Wang is a Chinese and American physicist known for her research on insect flight. She is a professor of physics and of mechanical and aerospace engineering at Cornell University.

Education and career
Wang studied physics at Fudan University, graduating in 1989, and completed a Ph.D. in physics at the University of Chicago in 1997.

After postdoctoral research at the University of Oxford and the Courant Institute of Mathematical Sciences, she became an assistant professor at Cornell University in 1999, in the Department of Theoretical and Applied Mechanics. She was promoted to associate professor in 2004, and moved to mechanical and aerospace engineering as a full professor in 2009. In 2011 she added an affiliation as a professor of physics.

Recognition
Wang was named a Fellow of the American Physical Society (APS) in 2014, after a nomination from the APS Division of Fluid Dynamics, "for fundamental contributions to our understanding of insect flight through simulations of hovering, elucidation of unsteady forces, development of computational tools, and analyses of flight efficiency, stability, and control". She was given a Simons Fellowship in Mathematics and Theoretical Physics in 2020.

A chamber music album by Elena Ruehr, Jane Wang Considers the Dragonfly, is named for Wang.

References

External links
Home page

Year of birth missing (living people)
Living people
American physicists
American women physicists
Chinese physicists
Chinese women physicists
Fluid dynamicists
American aerospace engineers
American women engineers
Chinese aerospace engineers
Chinese women engineers
Women aerospace engineers
Fudan University alumni
University of Chicago alumni
Cornell University faculty
Fellows of the American Physical Society